Washington's 31st legislative district is one of forty-nine districts in Washington for representation in the state legislature.

This district covers parts of southeastern King County,and parts of Pierce County, including the cities of Enumclaw, Buckley, Bonney Lake, Auburn, Sumner, Edgewood, South Prairie, Wilkeson and Carbonado.

The district's legislators are state senator Phil Fortunato and state representatives Drew Stokesbary (position 1) and Eric Robertson (position 2), all Republicans.

See also
Washington Redistricting Commission
Washington State Legislature
Washington State Senate
Washington House of Representatives

References

External links
Washington State Redistricting Commission
Washington House of Representatives
Map of Legislative Districts

31